The following is a list of notable deaths in June 2005.

Entries for each day are listed alphabetically by surname. A typical entry lists information in the following sequence:
 Name, age, country of citizenship at birth, subsequent country of citizenship (if applicable), reason for notability, cause of death (if known), and reference.

June 2005

1
Dmitri Bystrov, 37, Russian footballer.
Josephine Clay Ford, 81, American Ford Motor Company heiress and prominent philanthropist.
George Mikan, 80, American basketball player.
Louisiane Saint Fleurant, 80, Haitian artist and painter.
Geoffrey Toone, 94, British-based Irish actor.

2
Isabel Aretz, 96, Argentine musician.
Vittorio Duse, 89, Italian actor (The Godfather Part III).
Lucio España, 33, Colombian footballer, murdered.
Samir Kassir, 45, Lebanese journalist who supported democracy, assassinated.
Mike Marshall, 60, French-American actor (Moonraker).
Melita Norwood, 93, British who spied for the Soviet Union during the Cold War.
Andrea Pangrazio, 95, Italian Roman Catholic bishop.
Hy Peskin, 89, American photographer.
Alan Williams, 77, British economist.

3
Leon Askin, 97, Austrian actor.
Radomir Belaćević, 75, Serbian film producer and writer.
Teodoro Benigno, 82, Filipino journalist.
Michael Billington, 63, British actor.
Harold Cardinal, 60, Canadian Cree writer, lung cancer.
Nzo Ekangaki, 71, Cameroonian politician.
Alex Freeleagus, 77, Australian diplomat and lawyer.

4
Paul Amen, 88, American sportsman and banker.
Giancarlo De Carlo, 85, Italian architect.
Chloe Jones, 29, American adult film star.
Banks McFadden, 88, American football player, College Football Hall of Famer and former Clemson football player.
André Molitor, 93/4, Belgian civil servant, principal private secretary to King Baudouin I.
Jean O'Leary, 57, American gay and lesbian rights activist and politician.
Yin Shun, 99, Chinese Buddhist philosopher.
Lorna Thayer, 86, American character actress (Five Easy Pieces), Alzheimer's disease.

5
Adolfo Aguilar Zínser, 55, Mexican scholar, diplomat and politician.
Bele Bachem, 89, German graphic artist, book illustrator and writer.
Pepita Carpeña, 85, Spanish trade unionist and anarchist.
George Isaak, 72, Polish-born Australian physicist.
Susi Nicoletti, 86, Austrian film actress, complications from heart surgery.
Lothar Warneke, 68, German film director, screenwriter and actor.

6
Eduardo P. Archetti, 62, Argentine social scientist.
Anne Bancroft, 73, American actress (The Miracle Worker, The Graduate, The Pumpkin Eater), Oscar winner (1963), uterine cancer.
Dana Elcar, 77, American actor (MacGyver, The Sting, Fail Safe).
Maya Kopitseva, 81, Russian painter.
Pamela May, 88, British ballet dancer.
Oscar Morelli, 59, Mexican actor.
Siegfried Palm, 78, German cellist.
David Sutherland, 56, American illustrator for the original Dungeons & Dragons books.

7
Pater Barry, 67, Australian rules footballer.
Margaret Baxtresser, 82, American concert pianist.
Seán Doherty, 60, Irish politician.
Terry Long, 45, American professional football player, former NFL offensive lineman.
Edward Anthony McCarthy, 87, American Roman Catholic prelate, second Archbishop of Miami.

8
Ahmed Ali, Fijian academic and politician.
Ed Bishop, 72, American-British actor (UFO, Captain Scarlet and the Mysterons, Brass Target).
Arthur Dunkel, 72, Portuguese-Swiss GATT director-general.
Cáit Feiritéar, 88, Irish storyteller.
Servílio de Jesus Filho, 65, Brazilian football player, heart attack.
Luis Santiago, 27, Filipino film director, murdered.
Stan Wilson, 83, American singer and guitarist, heart disease.

9
Allan Ashbolt, 83, Australian journalist.
Slade Cutter, 93, American naval officer and gridiron football player.
Richard Eberhart, 101, American poet.
Ryan Alan Hade, 23, American sexual assault victim, whose case paved the way for laws allowing indefinite confinement of sexual predators, motorcycle accident.
Walter Hardwick, 73, Canadian academic and community leader.

10
Michèle Auclair, 80, French violinist.
J. James Exon, 83, American politician, former Democratic United States Senator (1979–1997) and Governor of Nebraska (1971–1979).
Lyphard, 36, American racehorse and sire old age.
Curtis Pitts, 89, American designer of the Pitts Special and other aircraft.
Kenneth N. Taylor, 88, American publisher and author, founder of Tyndale House Publishers and translator of The Living Bible.
Sir Paul Wright, 90, British diplomat.

11
Francesco Albanese, 92, Italian opera singer.
Anne-Marie Alonzo, 53, Canadian writer.
Gordon Baxter, 81, American radio personality.
José Beyaert, 79, French cyclist.
Audrey Brown, 92, British athlete.
Robert Clarke, 85, American actor.
Ghena Dimitrova, 64, Bulgarian opera singer.
Lon McCallister, 82, American actor.
Ron Randell, 86, Australian-born actor.
Juan José Saer, 67, Argentine novelist.
Vasco dos Santos Gonçalves, 84, Portuguese General, Prime Minister (1974–1975).

12
Bryan Beaumont, 66, Australian jurist.
Sonja Davies, 81, New Zealand trade unionist.
Brandy Davis, 77, American baseball player.
Eiichi Goto, 74, Japanese computer scientist.
Makobo Modjadji, 27, South African rain queen of the Balobedu people of South Africa.
David Whitney, 66, American art curator, collector, gallerist and critic, lung and bone cancer
Scott Young, 87, Canadian journalist and father of Neil Young.

13
Joan Abse, 78, English writer and art historian.
Jonathan Adams, 74, British actor (The Rocky Horror Picture Show).
Gerard Béhague, 67, French-born American ethnomusicologist.
Álvaro Cunhal, 91, Portuguese politician, secretary-general of the Portuguese Communist Party (1961–1992), deputy (1975–1992), writer and painter.
Eugénio de Andrade, 82, Portuguese poet.
David Diamond, 89, American composer.
Christopher Spencer Foote, 70, American chemist.
Jesús Moncada, Spanish writer.
Lane Smith, 69, American actor (Lois & Clark: The New Adventures of Superman, The Mighty Ducks, My Cousin Vinny), complications from amyotrophic lateral sclerosis.

14
Félix Acosta-Núñez, 81, Dominican Republic sports journalist.
Carlo Maria Giulini, 91, Italian conductor.
Norman Levine, 81, Canadian writer.
Mimi Parent, 80, Canadian surrealist painter.
Douglas Thollar, 86, Australian cricketer.
Robie Lester, 80, American voice artist, actress and singer.

15
Percy Arrowsmith, 105, English one-half of the world's documented longest marriage.
Rodrigo Asturias, 65, Guatemalan guerilla leader and politician, heart attack.
Hugh Bevan, 72, Australian cricketer.
Valeria Moriconi, 73, Italian actress, cancer.
Kathi Norris, 86, American television hostess, hosted one of the first TV talk shows on the DuMont Television Network, (The Kathi Norris Show, also known as Your TV Shopper, 1948–1950); mother of actress Koo Stark.

16
Corino Andrade, 99, Portuguese neurologist, discovered Familial amyloidotic polyneuropathy (FAP).
Gerald Davis, 88, British philatelist.
Enrique Laguerre, 99, Puerto Rican writer, poet, and teacher.
Geoffrey Parrinder, 95, British theologian and Methodist minister.
Ross Stretton, 53, Australian ballet dancer and artistic director of Australian Ballet.
James Weinstein, 78, American Jewish author, founder and publisher of In These Times.
Alex McAvoy, 77, Scottish actor (Pink Floyd – The Wall, The Vital Spark, Strictly Sinatra).

17
David Anderson, 65, Australian cricketer.
Billy Bauer, 89, American jazz guitarist.
Nanna Ditzel, 81, Danish furniture and interior designer.
William N. Fenton, 96, American scholar known for writings on the Iroquois.
Susanna Javicoli, 50, Italian actress (La nottata, Suspiria), kidney cancer.
Trevor Jones, 85, English cricketer.
Andrew Justice, 54, British Olympic rower.
Keith Morris, 66, English photographer.
Karl Mueller, 41, American founding bassist for the rock band Soul Asylum, throat cancer.
Mikhail Stern, 86/7, Soviet endocrinologist and dissident.
James A. Whyte, 85, Scottish theologian.
Ronald Winans, 48, American Grammy-winning gospel singer.

18
Syed Mushtaq Ali, 90, Indian cricketer, Padma Shree Award winner.
Tony Diment, 78, English cricketer.
Cay Forrester, 83, American writer and film actress (DOA)
Chris Griffin, 74, American jazz trumpeter.
Basil Kirchin, 77, British musician.
Sanjaya Lall, 64, Indian economist.
J. J. Pickle, 91, American politician, Democratic U.S. Congressional Representative from Texas (1963–1995).
Manuel Sadosky, 91, Argentine mathematician and Secretary of State of Science and Technology (1983–1989).
Georgie Woods, 78, American radio broadcaster.

19
Frank Alexander, 94, Australian cricketer.
Allan Beckett, 91, British engineer.
Alfred Deakin Brookes, 85, Australian intelligence officer.
Robert Ellis Cahill, 70, American folklorist and author.
Dave Carr, 48, English footballer.
Totta Näslund, 60, Swedish musician, singer and actor, liver cancer.
Ray Parkin, 94, Australian writer.

20
Larry Collins, 75, American writer.
Charles D. Keeling, 77, American scientist whose pioneering measurements showed a carbon dioxide buildup in the earth's atmosphere.
Jack Kilby, 81, American engineer, inventor of the integrated circuit and physics Nobel prize winner.
William López, 26, Salvadoran footballer, shot.
Bernard Adolph Schriever, 94, U.S. Air Force general, regarded as the father and architect of the United States Air Force space and ballistic missile programs.

21
Peter Bridgwater, 70, American soccer executive.
Steven F. Gaughan, 40, American police officer, murdered.
George Hawi, 67, Lebanese politician, former secretary general of Communist Party of Lebanon, killed by terrorists in an attack on his car.
Geoffrey Jones, 73, British documentary maker, cancer.
Ian McColl, 90, Scottish journalist and politician.
Jaime Sin, 76, Filipino Roman Catholic cardinal and former archbishop of Manila.
Louis H. Wilson, Jr., 85, US Medal of Honor recipient and Commandant of the Marine Corps.

22
Sunder Singh Bhandari, 84, Indian politician.
David Breeden, 54, American clarinetist.
William Donaldson, 70, British satirist and theatrical producer of Beyond The Fringe.
Michael Imoudu, 102, Nigerian labour union leader.
Roberto Olivo, 91, Venezuelan baseball umpire.
Carson Parks, 69, American musician.

23
Nikolay Afanasevsky, 64, Russian diplomat.
Shana Alexander, 79, American journalist, cancer.
Manolis Anagnostakis, 80, Greek poet.
Pietro Balestra, 70, Swiss economist.
Richard Hart Brown, 64, American neuroscientist.
Isidore Cohen, 82, American violinist with the Beaux Arts Trio.
Christian Roy Kaldager, 97, Norwegian Air Force officer.
Hanna Kvanmo, 79, Norwegian politician.
Sam Kweskin, 81, American comic book artist.

24
Lyman Bostock, Sr., 87, American baseball player.
Peter Casserly, 107, Australian centenarian, last surviving member of the First Australian Imperial Force serving on the Western Front in World War I.
Imogen Claire, British actress, played one of the Transylvanians in The Rocky Horror Picture Show.
Harry Ott, 71, German diplomat and politician.
Eva Philbin, 91, Irish chemist.
Carol Scott, 56, American television producer and director, cancer.
John Vivian, 4th Baron Swansea, 80, British peer and sports shooter.
Paul Winchell, 82, American voice actor (Winnie the Pooh, The Fox and the Hound, The Smurfs) and ventriloquist.

25
John Fiedler, 80, American actor (12 Angry Men, Winnie the Pooh, True Grit), cancer.
Sir Harry Gibbs, 88, Australian Chief Justice of the High Court of Australia 1981-87.
Salim Halali, 84, Algerian singer.
Chet Helms, 62, American rock music promoter.
Kâzım Koyuncu, 33, Turkish singer-songwriter and activist, died during treatment for testicular cancer in 2005.
Bob Vincent, 87, American big band singer and theatrical agent.

26
Filip Adwent, 49, Polish politician.
William Cornelius, 90, Australian cricketer.
Eknath Solkar, 57, Indian cricketer.
Joop Stoffelen, 84, Dutch footballer.
Grete Sultan, 99, German-American pianist.
Richard Whiteley, 61, British television presenter, pneumonia.

27
Robert Byrne, 50, American songwriter.
Frederick G. Dutton, 82, American lawyer, advisor to President Kennedy.
Shelby Foote, 88, American historian.
Frank Harte, 72, Irish traditional singer and song collector, heart attack.
Domino Harvey, 35, British model-turned-bounty hunter and daughter of actor, Laurence Harvey. Found dead in her bathtub of an overdose of Fentanyl painkillers.
Ray Holmes, 90, British fighter pilot, who protected Buckingham Palace during the Battle of Britain, cancer.
Owen McCarron, 76, Canadian cartoonist and puzzle creator.
Bhakti Tirtha Swami, 55, American spiritual guru.
John T. Walton, 58, American war veteran and son of Wal-Mart founder Sam Walton.
Sir Norman Wooding, 78, British industrialist.

28
Bardhyl Ajeti, 28, Serbian journalist, assassinated.
Cecil Baugh, 96, Jamaican master potter and artist.
Robert D. Clark, 95, American university administrator.
Thomas D. Clark, 101, American historian.
Victor Craig, 87, Irish cricketer.
Dick Dietz, 63, American baseball player (San Francisco Giants, Los Angeles Dodgers and Atlanta Braves), heart attack.
Yumika Hayashi, 35, Japanese pornographic film actress, choking.
Philip Hobsbaum, 72, British academic, poet and critic, diabetes.
Brenda Howard, 58, American LGBT-rights activist, colon cancer.
Arthur Maimane, 72, South African journalist and novelist.
John Rodney McRae, 70, American murderer.
Michael P. Murphy, 29, American naval officer.
Rowland B. Wilson, 74, American cartoonist and animator.

29
Ruslan Abdulgani, 91, Indonesian politician and diplomat.
James Gilbert Baker, 90, American astronomer.
Gerard C. Bond, 65, American geologist.
W. Burlie Brown, 83, American historian.
John Burgess, 71, Scottish bagpiper.
Bruce Malmuth, 71, American film director (Nighthawks, Hard to Kill) and actor (The Karate Kid), throat cancer.

30
Michael Donnelly, 46, United States Air Force fighter pilot and activist.
Clancy Eccles, 64, Jamaican ska and reggae singer, songwriter, record producer and talent scout, complications of a heart attack.
Christopher Fry, 97, British playwright.
Lilian Keil, 88, American nurse, highly decorated World War II and Korean War flight nurse.
Al Milnar, 91, American baseball player.
Pres Mull, 82, American football player and coach.
Éva Novák-Gerard, 75, Hungarian swimmer.
Qigong, 92, Chinese calligrapher, artist, painter, and sinologist.
Alexei Sultanov, 35, Russian-American pianist, stroke.
Robert Yount, 75, American musician, singer and songwriter in the country music genre.

References

2005-06
 06